John Wallace Carter (September 24, 1929 – March 31, 1991) was an American jazz clarinet, saxophone, and flute player. He is noted for the acclaimed Roots and Folklore series, a five-album concept album set inspired by African American life and experiences.

Biography
Born in Fort Worth, Texas, Carter attended I.M. Terrell High School, and played music with schoolmates Ornette Coleman and Charles Moffett in the 1940s.

Carter earned a Bachelor of Arts from Lincoln University in Jefferson, Missouri in 1949, and a Master of Arts from the University of Colorado in 1956.  He also studied at the North Texas State and University of California at Los Angeles.

From 1961, Carter was based mainly on the West Coast. There he met Bobby Bradford in 1965, with whom he subsequently worked on a number of projects, notably the New Jazz Art Ensemble. He also played with Hampton Hawes and Harold Land. In the 1970s Carter became well known on the basis of his solo concerts. At New Jazz Festival Moers in 1979, he and the German clarinet player Theo Jörgensmann performed on three days. Afterwards Carter received complimentary reviews and wide recognition from around the world. He and Jörgensmann met again in 1984. The program of the Berlin JazzFest was built around the clarinet. After Carter's solo performance, he and Jörgensmann also played together.

Between 1982 and 1990, Carter composed and recorded Roots and Folklore: Episodes in the Development of American Folk Music, five albums focused on African Americans and their history. The complete set was acclaimed by jazz critics as containing some of the best releases of the 1980s.

A clarinet quartet with Perry Robinson, Jörgensmann and Eckard Koltermann was planned for 1991, but Carter did not recover from a non-malignant tumor. Later that year he was inducted into the Down Beat Jazz Hall of Fame.

Discography

As leader/co-leader
1969: Seeking (Revelation/Hatology) 
1969: Flight for Four (Flying Dutchman)
1970: Self Determination Music (Flying Dutchman)
1972: Secrets (Revelation)
1975: No U-Turn – Live in Pasadena, 1975 (Dark Tree)
1977: Echoes from Rudolph's (Ibedon)
1979: Variations on Selected Themes for Jazz Quintet (Moers)
1980: Suite of Early American Folk Pieces for Solo Clarinet (Moers)
1980: Night Fire (Black Saint)
1982: Tandem 1 (Emanem)
1989: Comin' On (hat Art) with Bobby Bradford
1996: Tandem 2 (Emanem)
1982: Dauwhe  (Black Saint)
1986: Castles of Ghana (Gramavision)
1987: Dance of the Love Ghosts (Gramavision)
1988: Fields (Gramavision)
1989: Shadows on a Wall (Gramavision)

As sideman
With Tim Berne
 The Five Year Plan (Empire, 1979)
With Clarinet Summit
 You Better Fly Away (MPS, 1979)
 Clarinet Summit (India Navigation, 1983)
 Clarinet Summit, Vol. 2 (India Navigation, 1983)
 Southern Bells (Black Saint, 1987)
With Vinny Golia
 Spirits in Fellowship (Nine Winds, 1977)
 Live at the Century City Playhouse - Los Angeles, 1979 (Dark Tree, 2017)
 Compositions for Large Ensemble (Nine Winds, 1982)
With Richard Grossman
 In the Air (Nine Winds Records, 1991)
With John Lindberg
 The East Side Suite (Sound Aspects Records, 1983)
With James Newton
 The Mystery School (India Navigation, 1980)
 Water Mystery (Gramavision, 1986)
With Horace Tapscott
 The Dark Tree (Hat ART, 1991 [1989])

References

External links 
 Detailed discography, with personnel

Avant-garde jazz musicians
1928 births
1991 deaths
American jazz clarinetists
American jazz saxophonists
American male saxophonists
American jazz flautists
People from Fort Worth, Texas
University of Colorado alumni
Lincoln University (Missouri) alumni
University of North Texas College of Music alumni
University of California, Los Angeles alumni
Emanem Records artists
Moers Music artists
20th-century American saxophonists
Jazz musicians from Texas
20th-century American male musicians
American male jazz musicians
Flying Dutchman Records artists
Gramavision Records artists
20th-century flautists